Mansfield is an electoral district of the Legislative Assembly in the Australian state of Queensland.

The district is based in the south-eastern suburbs of Brisbane. It is named for the suburb of Mansfield and also includes the suburbs of Burbank, Rochedale and Wishart. The electorate was first created for the 1972 election.

Mansfield has tended to be a seat held by the government of the day; only two of its members have served in opposition.

Members for Mansfield

Election results

References

1. http://results.ecq.qld.gov.au/elections/state/State2015/results/district49.html

External links
 

Electoral districts of Queensland